is a platform video game developed by Tose and published by Nintendo for the Nintendo DS. It is the fourth game in The Legendary Starfy series. As with the other games in the series, Densetsu no Stafy 4 features Stafy, known as Starfy in Western regions, as the main character. He is joined by his sister Starly and his friend Moe the clam. The three of them help out other undersea creatures and fights numerous villains.

Plot
While Starfy and his family slept in the Pufftop Palace, a nearby land known as the Amy Kingdom was under attack. The heart-shaped Monamool Stone held there was stolen by an evil female snake named Degil. Mattel, a princess from Amy Castle, fled to seek Starfy's help. When Moe the clam saw Mattel and heard about her, he rushed toward Pufftop Palace, burst inside the front door, and told everyone that she would like to speak with them about the Amy Kingdom tragedy. Starfy dozed off, and Moe told him to listen, then Starly petted Moe and talked to him about his love, Ruby the zebra turkeyfish, while Starfy sat and played with his handheld game console that resembles the original Nintendo DS. Later, after their relaxation, Starfy, Starly and Moe went with Mattel to stop Degil and restore peace to the Amy Kingdom.

Gameplay

Gameplay in Densetsu no Stafy 4 is quite similar to the previous games in the series. New features were added in this game that make use of the Nintendo DS' advanced hardware. The visuals are still 2-D, albeit with completely redrawn sprites, while the backgrounds are 3-D. Densetsu no Stafy 4 takes advantage of the dual screens, using them to show both the main game and map of the level simultaneously, while it uses the touchscreen to play the bonus stages, scroll the map, interact in the title screen and navigate menus. Some costumes in the costume collections of Densetsu no Stafy 2 and Densetsu no Stafy 3 return in fully rendered 3-D, which allows the player to manipulate the 3D models of Starfy and Starly to see more of their costumes.

Development
In order to give fans a chance to contribute to the development of Densetsu no Stafy 4, Nintendo and Tose created a costume contest, and gave fans a picture of Starfy (in PDF format) to print, color, and send in. A picture of Starfy in a rocket suit was shown to the Starfy fans as an example on how to color over the coloring picture. The winning costumes also appear on the official Densetsu no Stafy 4 website. Most other artworks were featured in the first credits sequence of Densetsu no Stafy 4.

Reception
Densetsu no Stafy 4 was the fourth best-selling game in Japan during its week of release at 47,971 copies. Japanese sales totalled 167,136 copies during 2006. Famitsu scored the game a 33 out of 40 based on the opinions of four reviewers.

Notes

References

External links
 Official website 
 Costume contest website 

2006 video games
Japan-exclusive video games
Nintendo DS games
Nintendo DS-only games
Platform games
Tose (company) games
Video games developed in Japan
Video games set on fictional planets
Video games with underwater settings
The Legendary Starfy